Annie Tietze (born October 7, 1950) is a Democratic former member of the Kansas House of Representatives. She represented the 56th from 2007 to 2013 and the 53rd district from 2013 to 2016.

Tietze has worked as a Court Appointed Special Advocate and a teacher. She received her BS in Education from Emporia State University and Masters in Communication Studies at the University of Kansas.

She is the local president of the Kansas National Education Association and a member of the First Methodist Church.

Committee membership
Federal and State Affairs

Commerce, Labor, and Economic Development

Major donors
The top 5 donors to Tietze's 2008 campaign:
1. Kansans for Lifesaving Cures 	$750 	
2. Kansas Hospital Assoc 	$750
3. Kansas Optometric Assoc 	$700 	
4. Kansas Contractors Assoc 	$600
5. Kansas Physical Therapy Assoc 	$600

References

External links
 Kansas Legislature - Annie Tietze
 Project Vote Smart profile
 Kansas Votes profile
 State Surge - Legislative and voting track record
 Campaign contributions: 2006, 2008

Democratic Party members of the Kansas House of Representatives
1950 births
Living people
Women state legislators in Kansas
Emporia State University alumni
University of Kansas alumni
Schoolteachers from Kansas
American women educators
21st-century American women politicians
21st-century American politicians